Rho Cygni, Latinized from ρ Cygni, is a yellow-hued star in the northern constellation of Cygnus. It is visible to the naked eye with an apparent magnitude of 4.02. The measured annual parallax shift is 26.39 milliarcseconds, which yields a distance estimate of 124 light years. It is moving further from the Sun with a radial velocity of +6.88. The star is a member of the thin disk population of the Milky Way galaxy.

The suffix notation indicates the spectrum shows a mild underabundance of iron in the outer atmosphere. It has about 2.16 times the mass of the Sun and 7.81 times the Sun's girth. The star is radiating 37 times the Sun's luminosity from its enlarged photosphere at an effective temperature of 5,100 K.

References

G-type giants
Cygnus (constellation)
Cygni, Rho
Durchmusterung objects
Cygni, 73
205435
106481
8252